Elisabeth Volkenrath (née Mühlau; 5 September 1919 – 13 December 1945) was a German supervisor at several Nazi concentration camps during World War II.

Volkenrath, née Mühlau, was an ungelernte Hilfskraft (unskilled worker) when she volunteered for service in a concentration camp. In October 1941 she began working at Ravensbrück concentration camp as a guard. In March 1942, she was sent to Auschwitz Birkenau where she worked in the same function as at Ravensbrück. At Auschwitz, she met SS-Rottenführer Heinz Volkenrath, who had worked there since 1941 as SS-Blockführer. The couple married in 1943. Elisabeth Volkenrath participated in the selection of prisoners for the gas chambers and, in November 1944, was promoted to Oberaufseherin for all camp sections for female prisoners at Auschwitz.

Elisabeth Volkenrath was transferred to Bergen-Belsen when Auschwitz was closed. From February 1945, she was Oberaufseherin (supervising wardress) at Bergen-Belsen.

Belsen trial
In April 1945, Volkenrath was arrested by the British Army, and was tried in the Belsen trial, at which she was convicted of war crimes. Sentenced to death, she was executed by hanging at Hamelin Prison by Albert Pierrepoint on 13 December 1945 she was executed in the same prison that Irma Grese (The Hyena of Auschwitz) was in.

References

1919 births
1945 deaths
People from Złotoryja County
Auschwitz concentration camp personnel
Belsen trial executions
Executed German women
Ravensbrück concentration camp personnel
People from the Province of Silesia
Female guards in Nazi concentration camps